Kachemak Selo (Russian: Качемак Село) is a small unincorporated community in Kenai Peninsula Borough, Alaska, United States.  Located on the Kenai Peninsula, it lies roughly 30 miles east of Homer. The community is one of several settlements of Russian Old Believers in the Fox River area. There are about 160 residents. The only land access is by driving east of Homer to Voznesenka and descending a steep switchback trail to the beach, then traveling about 1 mile up the beach to reach Kachemak Selo.

Geography
Kachemak Selo is located at  (59.79148, -151.07465).

References

Old Believer communities in the United States
Populated coastal places in Alaska on the Pacific Ocean
Road-inaccessible communities of Alaska
Russian-American culture in Alaska
Russian communities in the United States
Unincorporated communities in Alaska
Unincorporated communities in Kenai Peninsula Borough, Alaska